36th meridian may refer to:

36th meridian east, a line of longitude east of the Greenwich Meridian
36th meridian west, a line of longitude west of the Greenwich Meridian